Lee Myung-hwa (born July 29, 1973) is a former South Korean football player who was a member of South Korea women's national football team.

She was a foil fencer by February 1990. In 1990, she joined women's football; soon she was one of the first members of South Korea women's national football team.

Honours 
 Player of the Year (Women) : 2002

References

1973 births
Living people
South Korean women's footballers
South Korea women's international footballers
WK League players
Women's association football forwards
Women's association football defenders
Sportspeople from North Gyeongsang Province
Footballers at the 1990 Asian Games
Footballers at the 1994 Asian Games
Footballers at the 1998 Asian Games
Footballers at the 2002 Asian Games
Incheon Hyundai Steel Red Angels WFC players
Asian Games competitors for South Korea
2003 FIFA Women's World Cup players
Universiade medalists in football
Universiade bronze medalists for South Korea